Events in the year 1995 in Mexico.

Incumbents

Federal government
 President: Ernesto Zedillo
 Interior Secretary (SEGOB): Esteban Moctezuma (until 28 June), Emilio Chuayffet (starting 28 June)
 Secretary of Foreign Affairs (SRE): José Ángel Gurría
 Communications Secretary (SCT): Carlos Ruiz Sacristán
 Secretary of Defense (SEDENA): Enrique Cervantes Aguirre
 Secretary of Navy: José Ramón Lorenzo Franco
 Secretary of Labor and Social Welfare: Santiago Oñate Laborde (until 18 August)
 Secretary of Welfare: Carlos Rojas Gutiérrez
 Secretary of Public Education: Fausto Alzati/Miguel Limón Rojas
 Tourism Secretary (SECTUR): Silvia Hernández Enríquez
 Secretary of the Environment (SEMARNAT): Julia Carabias Lillo
 Secretary of Health (SALUD): Juan Ramón De La Fuente

Supreme Court

 President of the Supreme Court:

Governors

 Aguascalientes: Otto Granados Roldán, (Institutional Revolutionary Party, PRI)
 Baja California
Ernesto Ruffo Appel, (National Action Party PAN), until October 31.
Héctor Terán Terán, (PAN), starting November 1.
 Baja California Sur:
 Campeche: Jorge Salomón Azar García
 Chiapas: Eduardo Robledo Rincón/Francisco Barrio
 Chihuahua: Fernando Baeza Meléndez
 Coahuila: Rogelio Montemayor Seguy
 Colima: Carlos de la Madrid Virgen
 Durango: Maximiliano Silerio Esparza
 Guanajuato: Carlos Medina Plascencia/Vicente Fox
 Guerrero: Rubén Figueroa Alcocer
 Hidalgo: Jesús Murillo Karam
 Jalisco: Carlos Rivera Aceves/Alberto Cárdenas Jiménez
 State of Mexico: Emilio Chuayffet/César Camacho Quiroz
 Michoacán: Ausencio Chávez Hernández
 Morelos: Jorge Carrillo Olea (PRI).
 Nayarit: Diódoro Carrasco Altamirano
 Nuevo León: Sócrates Rizzo/Benjamin Clairmond (PRI)
 Oaxaca: Manuel Bartlett Díaz
 Puebla: Enrique Burgos García
 Querétaro: Mario Villanueva Madrid
 Quintana Roo: Horacio Sánchez Unzueta
 San Luis Potosí: Horacio Sánchez Unzueta
 Sinaloa: Renato Vega Alvarado
 Sonora: Manlio Fabio Beltrones Rivera
 Tabasco: Roberto Madrazo Pintado
 Tamaulipas: Manuel Cavazos Lerma	
 Tlaxcala: José Antonio Álvarez Lima
 Veracruz: Patricio Chirinos Calero
 Yucatán: Víctor Cervera Pacheco
 Zacatecas: Arturo Romo Gutiérrez
Regent of Mexico City: Oscar Espinosa Villarreal

Events

 1995 Zapatista Crisis 
 Aeronaves TSM founded and started operating. 
 January 1: The G3 Free Trade Agreement goes into effect.
 June 28: Aguas Blancas massacre 
 August 27: 1995 Mexican referendums 
 September 14: 1995 Guerrero earthquake 
 October 9: 1995 Colima–Jalisco earthquake 
 October 22: Nuestra Belleza México 1995

Awards
Belisario Domínguez Medal of Honor – Miguel León-Portilla

Births
 January 2: Renata Notni, actress and model
 February 7: Roberto Osuna, baseball player
 March 12: Daniela Magdaleno, bullfighting photographer (d. 2018).
 November 16: Victor González, baseball player

Deaths
July 11: Claudio Brook, actor and producer, winner of two Ariel Awards, stomach cancer (b. 1927)

Hurricanes

 August 9–12: Tropical Storm Gabrielle 
 September 12–16: Hurricane Ismael
 September 27–October 5: Hurricane Opal
 October 7– 21: Hurricane Roxanne

Sport

 1994–95 Mexican Primera División season 
 1994–95 Copa Mexico
 Sultanes de Monterrey win the Mexican League.
 1995 ITU Triathlon World Championships, is held in Cancún. 
 CMLL 62nd Anniversary Show

References

External links

 
Mexico